Aaryn Élan Doyle (born January 4, 1993) is a Canadian actress, singer and dancer. She is best known for her role as Lola Scott in the Disney Channel Original Movie Camp Rock.  In 2008, Aaryn  was signed to the Ford Modeling Agency, but is currently represented by IBIS Talent Management. Doyle has represented brand lines such as Diesel and Nike, as seen in Camp Rock red carpet shots.  According to media insiders, Aaryn is to embark upon a new Marketing endeavour in business as well as in entertainment in 2015 with a full music media campaign in the works in order to take advantage of Aaryn's vocal talents and songwriting capabilities.

Aaryn Elan is also the voice of Pansy in Miss Spider's Sunny Patch Friends and Foo in The Save-Ums!.

Life and career

Aaryn Elan started her career at the age of six while attending St. John Catholic School in Lincoln, following a win at Model Search America (MSA).

Aaryn has appeared in films, television shows, and commercials, and has also voiced many animation/voice-over projects. She was the lead female vocalist for a 12-piece Toronto band for 3 years from age 12 to 15, but later performed with other TO bands, and was a member of CTV's Canadian Idol choir ensemble in 2005. In Fall 2007, Doyle joined the cast of Disney Channel original movie Camp Rock, with the Jonas Brothers and Demi Lovato and was released on June 20, 2008.

Aaryn was featured in the Camp Rock song "What It Takes", in addition to contributing vocals for the tracks "Our Time Is Here" and "We Rock" as the character Lola Scott. However, Doyle did not reprise her role in Camp Rock 2: The Final Jam.

Aaryn Elan appeared in the films Sins of the Father and Jasper, Texas. She is a cast member of the animated television series Miss Spider's Sunny Patch Kids with Brooke Shields, and Rick Moranis, before starring in Miss Spider's Sunny Patch Friends with Kristin Davis as Miss Spider. She also stars in the Emmy and Grammy award-winning and nominated animated series The Save-Ums!, as well as Friends and Heroes and the animated short film/TV movie Tomboy.

Past years have seen Aaryn recording with her youth trio for a CCC production company; their tracks can be heard on CTS. Between the ages of 10 and 12, she has recorded over 70 pop/gospel songs and has starred in CBC radio dramas.

In 2007, she appeared on an episode of Little Mosque on the Prairie as a teenage Muslim girl, followed by a guest starring role as a model on The Latest Buzz (season 3). In 2010, Aaryn Elan's vocal styling was used in the pilot episode of Life Unexpected, singing solo on the reproduced cover soundtrack of I Will Always Love You.

Filmography

Other works

Discography

Camp Rock (soundtrack) 
What It Takes
Our Time Is Here (with Demi Lovato & Meaghan Jette Martin)
We Rock (with the cast of Camp Rock)

Soundtrack

Life Unexpected (soundtrack) 
I Will Always Love You (Pilot) TV episode 2010

Miss Spider's Sunny Patch Friends (soundtrack) 
Hi Ho Away We Go (The Prince, the Princess and the Bee) TV episode/special 2006
Do the Buggy Conga (The Thinking Stone/Big Bad Buggysitter) TV episode 2006
Have A Happy hatch Day (Bug Your Mom Day: A Cloudy Day in Sunny Patch) TV episode 2005      
Faky Snaky Dance (Scary Scaly Tale: A Bug-A-Boo Day Play) TV episode 2004      
La la la Ladybug (Ant-tuition: Sing It Sister) TV episode 2004

References

External links

 Aaryn Doyle on MySpace
 Aaryn Doyle on Instagram
 Aaryn Doyle on Twitter
 Aaryn Doyle on BlogSpot

1993 births
Living people
Actresses from Toronto
Black Canadian actresses
Black Canadian musicians
Canadian child actresses
Canadian film actresses
Canadian people of Irish descent
Canadian television actresses
Canadian voice actresses
Musicians from Toronto
21st-century Canadian actresses
21st-century Canadian women singers